James Pennington (born 26 April 1939 in Golborne, Lancashire), is an English former footballer who played as a right winger in the Football League.

References

External links

1939 births
Living people
English footballers
People from Golborne
Association football wingers
Manchester City F.C. players
Crewe Alexandra F.C. players
Grimsby Town F.C. players
Oldham Athletic A.F.C. players
Rochdale A.F.C. players
Northwich Victoria F.C. players
English Football League players